Vinaròs is a city located in eastern Spain and the capital of the Baix Maestrat in the province of Castelló. It is in the border between the Valencian Country and Catalonia. Vinaròs is a fishing harbour and tourist destination.

History 
The first historical record of Vinaròs is in 1233, when the Moorish hamlet of Binarlaros-Ibn Arus in eastern al-Andaluz was captured by King James I of Aragon. It was under rule of the Knights templar order between 1294 and 1311, and of the order of Montesa during the 14th century.

The town grew during the 16th and 17th centuries, when fortifications and navy yards were built, and attained great prosperity during the following two centuries, due to its involvement in ship building and Valencian wine trade. The town suffered a strong decline in the early 20th century as a consequence of the spread of phylloxera in the regions vineyards, which devastated wine production.

Today, the prosperity of Vinaròs is bound to tourism and fishing, it is renowned for its tasty prawns. Vinaròs is part of the Taula del Sénia free association of municipalities.

Main sights 
Sights in Vinaròs is the fortress-like Església Arxiprestal de l'Assumpció (Archpriestal Church of the Assumption of Our Lady), built in the prevailing Renaissance architectural style during 1583-1596, with a 'new' Baroque portal added during 1698–1702.

Culture

Carnival
The Carnival of Vinaròs usually takes place during January, February, or March. It has 33 troupes composed of many people (the biggest troupe has around 550 members). Each troupe is represented by a queen who creates a spectacular costume.

Calendar

1st day (Friday): in the Town Hall, Carnival starts by a performance decorated with the Carnival's topic (In 2017 "Bollywood") and the "Carnestoltes" presentation ("Carnestoltes" is a huge wooden man dressed in a costume reflecting the Carnival's Topic). Then, the Mayor and the queens open the Carnival's huts enclosure (in the Fóra Forat Walk where each night's parties are held. Each troupe has a hut with free entry where visitors can enjoy the night parties).

2nd day (Saturday): The Queen's Presentation, where they show their fantastic costumes to all the people (until this day, no one knows the form of the queen's costume). It's located on the old football pitch (Boverals H street / Football pitch street. It's placed in front of the river).

3rd day (Sunday): Flour's battle and Disguised pets Competition in the Carnival's huts enclosure (Fóra Forat Walk), placed in the Fóra Forat Walk both.

4th day (Monday): dinner for the elderly.

5th day (Tuesday): some troupes compete in the Karaoke Song Contest.

6th day (Wednesday): people dress up with thematic costumes reflecting the Carnival's theme and they enjoy the night at the Carnival's huts enclosure (Fóra Forat Walk).

7th day (Thursday): everyone wears pajamas and enjoys the night at the Carnival's huts enclosure (Fóra Forat Walk).

8th day (Friday): people wear costumes (There are people who, instead of buying a normal costume, design, make and sew up their own) and enjoy the night at the Carnival's huts enclosure (Fóra Forat Walk).

9th day (Saturday) and 10th day (Sunday): on Saturday (7 p.m.) and Sunday (6 p.m.), troupes parade in a circuit through the major streets of Calle Pilar, Calle Pablo Ruiz Picasso, Calle San Francisco, Avenida País Valencià, Calle Arcipreste Bono, Plaza 1º de Mayo, Calle Costa y Borrás, Avenida País Valencià, Calle Arcipreste Bono, Calle Socorro, Plaza Jovellar and Calle Pilar.

11th day (Monday): Carnival ends at the Town Hall and then the "Carnestoltes" are burned on the beach or in waste ground.

Moreover, in August there's the Summer Carnival with The Queen's Presentation to show the tourists how Carnival is like in Vinaròs.

Politics 
In the 2007 Spanish local elections, the People's Party obtained ten city councillors, the PSPV-PSOE, seven, the Partit de Vinaròs Independent (PVI), three, and the Valencian Nationalist Bloc, one.

In the 2011 Spanish local elections, the People's Party obtained an absolute majority with 11 councillors elected. The PSPV-PSOE obtained 6 city councillors, the Valencian Nationalist Bloc 2. The PVI lost two seats, obtaining just one councillor while Republican Left of the Valencian Country obtained 1 city councillor.

In the 2015 Spanish local elections, the People's Party lost three city councillors, obtaining 8 seats. The PSPV-PSOE lost two city councillors, receiving 4. The electors association Each and every one are Vinaròs (TSV) got 5 city councillors and the other political parties obtained the same number of councillors (2 Compromís, 1 Independent Party of Vinaròs and 1 Civic Agreement). The PSPV-PSOE, Commitment Coalition and  Each and every one are Vinaròs (TSV) signed the "Stables Covenant" in order to form a government with absolute majority, that is with 11 city councillors (5 of TSV, 4 of PSPV-PSOE and 2 of Compromís). In this document, they agreed that the leader of the most-voted list would be the mayor, Mr. Enric Pla Vall, and the other leaders would be the first and second deputy mayors depending on the elected city councillors they had. So the first deputy mayor was Mr. Guillem Alsina Gilabert from the PSPV-PSOE and the second one was Mr. Domènec Fontanet from Compromís.

People 
Louis Joseph, Duke of Vendôme (1654 - 1712),  marshal in the War of the Spanish Succession fighting on the side of the Bourbons. He died at Vinaròs from indigestion after eating a serving of king prawns.
Vicent Guilló Barceló  (Vinaròs, 1647 - València, 1698), Baroque painter.
Maria Conesa (Vinaròs, 189x - México, 197x) actress in México as "la gatita blanca".
Carles Santos Ventura (born 1940), pianist, composer, painter, sculptor and performer.
Leopoldo Querol: pianist and professor at the National Conservatory of Music.
Joan Elies Adell i Pitarch: poet
José María Salaverría: writer.

References

External links

 Official Vinaròs website

Municipalities in the Province of Castellón
Baix Maestrat